Vladimir is a commune in Gorj County, Oltenia, Romania, with a population of 2,793. It is composed of four villages: Andreești, Frasin, Valea Deșului, and Vladimir. Tudor Vladimirescu, the Romanian revolutionary hero and the leader of the Wallachian uprising of 1821 was born in the Vladimir village and the house where he was born is now a museum.

References

External links
Casa memoriala "Tudor Vladimirescu"'

Communes in Gorj County
Localities in Oltenia